Kommadi is a suburb of the city of Visakhapatnam state of Andhra Pradesh, India.

About
It is a suburb of Visakhapatnam, and known for engineering colleges and as a residential area.

Entertainment
There is a multiplex called STBL Cineworld with 2 screens.

Transport
It is well connected with Gajuwaka, NAD X Road, Maddilapalem, Dwaraka Nagar and Gopalapatnam.

APSRTC bus routes

References

Neighbourhoods in Visakhapatnam